Sydney Peterson (born February 17, 2002) is an American para cross-country skier.

Career
She won the silver medal in the women's 10km standing cross-country skiing event at the 2021 World Para Snow Sports Championships held in Lillehammer, Norway. She also won the bronze medal in the women's long-distance standing cross-country skiing event.

References

External links 
 
 https://www.teamusa.org/usparanordicskiing/athletes/Sydney-Peterson

2002 births
Living people
People from Lake Elmo, Minnesota
American female cross-country skiers
Paralympic cross-country skiers of the United States
Cross-country skiers at the 2022 Winter Paralympics
Medalists at the 2022 Winter Paralympics
Paralympic medalists in cross-country skiing
Paralympic gold medalists for the United States
Paralympic silver medalists for the United States
Paralympic bronze medalists for the United States
21st-century American women